Nikola Vasilev Dimitrov (born 11 December 1939) is a Bulgarian wrestler. He competed in the men's freestyle flyweight at the 1960 Summer Olympics.

References

1939 births
Living people
Bulgarian male sport wrestlers
Olympic wrestlers of Bulgaria
Wrestlers at the 1960 Summer Olympics